Dyadobacter ginsengisoli  is a Gram-negative, non-spore-forming, rod-shaped, aerobic and non-motile Gram-negative bacterium from the genus of Dyadobacter which has been isolated from soil from a ginseng field in Pocheon in Korea.

References

Further reading

External links
Type strain of Dyadobacter ginsengisoli at BacDive -  the Bacterial Diversity Metadatabase

Cytophagia
Bacteria described in 2006